Ceremosnja is a village in eastern Serbia, in the vicinity of the town of Kučevo, famous for its cave, which has been open since 1980 for tourists.

Populated places in Braničevo District